Laura Hughes (born 24 March 1993) is a Welsh weightlifter. She competed in the women's 75 kg event at the 2018 Commonwealth Games, winning the bronze medal.

References

External links

1993 births
Living people
Welsh female weightlifters
Place of birth missing (living people)
Weightlifters at the 2018 Commonwealth Games
Commonwealth Games bronze medallists for Wales
Commonwealth Games medallists in weightlifting
Medallists at the 2018 Commonwealth Games